The racquetball - men's singles competition at the World Games 2009 took place from July 21 to 23 at the Chung Cheng Martial Arts Stadium in Kaohsiung, Taiwan. Players qualified for this event from their performances at the 2008 Racquetball World Championships. 


Last 16

Last 8

References

Men's singles
Racquetball at multi-sport events